Ekpeye (Ekpe ye) is an Igboid language of Rivers State and Imo State, Nigeria.

Writing system

Distribution
Imo State: Ohaji/Egbema LGA
Rivers State: Ahoada East, Ahoada West, and Ogba–Egbema–Ndoni LGAs

References

Works cited
 

Igboid languages
Languages of Nigeria
Indigenous languages of Rivers State